The 2019 Piala Indonesia Finals was the two-legged final that decided the winner of the 2018–19 Piala Indonesia, the seventh season of Indonesia's main football cup.

Unlike all the previous editions, it was a two-legged match home-and-away format.

The finals was contested between Persija and PSM. The draw to determine which team would be hosting the first and second leg was held on 9 July 2019. The first leg was hosted by Persija at Gelora Bung Karno in Jakarta on 21 July, while the second leg was hosted by PSM at Andi Mattalata in Makassar on 6 August 2019. The second leg was originally to be held on 28 July 2019. However, due to safety concerns resulting from the attack on the bus of Persija prior to the match, the date of second leg was moved.

PSM won the finals 2–1 on aggregate for their first ever Piala Indonesia title.

Teams

Road to the final

Note: In all results below, the score of the finalist is given first (H: home; A: away).

Format
The final was played on a home-and-away two-legged basis. The away goals rule would be applied, and extra time would be played if the aggregate score was tied after the second leg and away goals rule. If the aggregate score was still tied after extra time, a penalty shoot-out would be used to determine the winner.

Matches
All times are local, WIB (UTC+7).

First leg

Second leg

Notes

References 

Piala Indonesia Finals
Piala Indonesia Finals